Recorded history of the LGBT community in Seattle begins with the Washington Sodomy Law of 1893. In the 1920s and 1930s there were several establishments in Seattle which were open to homosexuals. The Double Header, opened in 1934, may have been the oldest continuously operating gay bar in the United States until it closed in December 2015.  On 19 November 1958, an injunction instructed the city police not to question customers of gay bars unless there was a "good cause" in connection with an actual investigation. In the 1960s, Seattle came to be seen as providing an accepting environment, and an increasing number of gay and lesbians were drawn to the city. In 1967 University of Washington's Professor Nick Heer founded the Dorian Society, the first group in Seattle to support gay rights.

Seattle's LGBT community is the second largest in the United States after San Francisco with 12.9% of the city identifying as LGBT.  The Capitol Hill neighborhood in particular is considered by many the "center of gay life" in Seattle, with gay-friendly businesses and nightlife, and a resource center.

Past
The Washington Sodomy Law was adopted in 1893, and in the same year, a King County court sentenced Charles Wesley to seven years at hard labor for "intent to know" Eddie Kalberg, "a male person".

Bars, cabarets, clubs, and dancefloors
In the 1920s and 1930s, early establishments open to homosexuals were concentrated in areas of ill repute. Pioneer Square, also known as "Skid Road" or "Fairyville," with its bars, clubs, and cabarets probably was the center of early public gay life in Seattle. The Casino, opened in 1930 on the corner of Washington Street and 2nd Avenue, was known as "the only place on the West Coast that was open and free for gay people", and where same-sex dancing was allowed. The Double Header above The Casino, opened in 1934, was possibly the oldest continuously operating gay bar in the United States until it closed at the end of December 2015. The Spinning Wheel on Union Street and 2nd Avenue, was a cabaret featuring female impersonators.  Both were open to both gay and straight clientele during the 1930s. The Greyhound bus depot, Volunteer Park on Capitol Hill, and the restrooms in the University Plaza Hotel and at the University of Washington were also known as meeting spots for gay men.

The Garden of Allah was the most popular homosexual Seattle cabaret in the 1940s and 1950s. Regular vaudeville and drag shows were held there with singers dressed in drag. It was a hotspot in the post war period with service-persons, but in the 1960s the military made most gay establishments in Seattle off-limits. In the 1960s and 1970s new gay Seattle hotspots such as the Mocambo, the Golden Horseshoe and the Golden Crown opened. In the 1970s vaudeville had changed and Seattle began the trend of courts, public drag clubs "with 'emperors' and 'empresses' where "lip –synching would remove the need for singing talent and open the way to any man who could dance, quip, or even just costume. Performances would change, with ever-more flamboyant costuming, more energetic and choreographed dancing and even laser shows."

In the 1950s and 1960s, Seattle's dance clubs served as important points for the gay community to meet and strategize, which according to Gary Atkins, author of Gay Seattle. Stories of Exile and Belonging, may be likened to the African-Americans who used churches to organize during the civil rights movement.

During the 1950s, when anti-sodomy laws were still in effect in the United States, gay bars, clubs and bathhouses became scrutinized. Owners of such establishments would frequently bribe law enforcement to ensure their survival as well as prevent harassment of their mostly gay clientele and escape legal consequences themselves. Seattle city officials believed that the city was not doing enough to enforce laws discriminating against homosexuality and feared that eventually it would be as openly acceptable as in cities such as San Francisco. As a result of the political upheaval regarding Seattle gay bars, the Armed Forces Disciplinary Control Board sent fourteen gay establishments letters threatening to bar them from military personnel. In 1966, the Seattle police chief suggested restrictions on gay bars such as withholding their liquor licenses.

The Dorian Society

In 1965 group of openly gay men were contacted by Rev. Mineo Katagiri  to talk with religious leaders in the city. The first radio interview with openly gay men was broadcast on KRAB radio by members of that group.  The Dorian Society was formed in 1967. The book Gay Seattle goes into detail about this group.

The Dorian Society founded in 1967 by Nick Heer, a professor at the University of Washington was the first group in Seattle to support gay rights and which published a newsletter about current issues and events in the gay community. The name was a reference to the Doric Hellenic warriors of Ancient Greece who considered homosexuality glamorous and the society was modelled on New Zealand's Dorian Society. Their mission was to create a more respectable image of the Seattle homosexual. They also wanted the reform the Seattle sodomy laws. In response to their efforts a Seattle Times headline stated on September 21, 1966, Tolerant Reputation: Seattle homosexual problem reported to be 'out of hand. This article stated the Seattle police wanted to suppress the LBGT community, partially by removing liquor licenses at gay bars. In May 1967 The Daily of the University of Washington did a series on the gay community, which for the first time represented the community in a more positive light. Much of this positivity had to with the vigilant PR and work of the Dorian Society.

Singer v. Hara
On September 20, 1971, John Singer, later known as Faygele ben Miriam, and fellow activist Paul Barwick applied for a marriage license at the King County Administration Building in Seattle, not being keen on actually getting married but wanting "to make a point about having the same rights as heterosexuals." Their request was refused by then-county auditor (later County Assessor) Lloyd Hara. They were among the first same-sex couples in the United States to apply for a marriage license, causing a flurry of media coverage and leading to a lawsuit, Singer v. Hara, which ended in 1974 with a unanimous rejection by the Washington State Court of Appeals.

Pride Week

From June 24 to June 30, 1974, Seattle's lesbians and gays celebrated the city's first Gay Pride Week'. It was the first event in the region in which the gay community as a whole came out of its collective closet. On June 28, 1974, the Gay Community Center at 1726 16th Avenue E held a grand opening. On June 29, 1974, a Saturday, the Seattle Post-Intelligencer reported that about 200 attended a picnic at Occidental Park in Pioneer Square. Entertainment included music and a "Gayrilla theater." Banners from the stage read "Proud to be lesbian, Proud to be gay." In the afternoon, activities moved to Volunteer Park and included roller-skating and a sing along at the top of the Volunteer Park Water Tower. That evening, a street dance was held in Occidental Park that featured music by Blue Moon and Sue Isaacs. On June 30, 1974, Gay Pride Week concluded with a "Gay-In" at the Seattle Center that featured "zany dress, general frivolity, carousing and a circle dance around the main International fountain." Since 2011, Seattle Gay Pride Parade and Festival has drawn more than 350,000 people annually.

Present
Today, sodomy laws have been repealed by the Supreme Court, and Seattle has generally become more affirming of LGBT people. More recently, gay bars and clubs have enjoyed a central prominence for community organizing. In 1987 Life Long AIDS Alliance created the "Jars in Bars" program that allows community volunteers to engage in education outreach regarding AIDS and enables patrons of Capitol Hill bars to donate to their cause. The Seattle mayor and other city officials have become more receptive to the gay community.

Hate crimes
Despite the general atmosphere of tolerance towards the LGBT community in Seattle, there have been instances of homophobic hate crimes, particularly in Capitol Hill and in open public spaces such as Volunteer Park. In one case, in January 2009, eleven gay bars and clubs in Seattle were sent letters threatening ricin attacks.

Health issues
In the later 1990s and early 2000s media announced a dangerous sense of malaise and complacency in the gay community generally over safe-sex practices. AIDS was becoming more "normalized", risky sexual practices were increasing and gonorrhea, syphilis and chlamydia cases all rose. A combination of effectiveness in anti-retroviral therapies and increase in use of intravenous drugs influenced a rise in sexually transmitted infections (STI). In early 1999, King County Public Health reported an "alarming" increase in sexually transmitted infections amongst men who have sex with men. The "watershed moment" occurred in 2003 when King County Public Health released a report saying that STI had increased in gay/bisexual men by 40% over the past year.

In an article, Michael Brown notes that the geography is intertwined with politics. Seattle's sexual playgrounds were all geographically concentrated and were open at times that other establishments weren't. Seattle's preventative efforts may also have been part of the issue.

In the beginning there was a lot of denial that Seattle would get hit by the AIDS virus but the community quickly organized and many activist say now that Seattle's gay community has one of the strongest HIV/AIDS networks.

The first person to publicly be diagnosed with AIDS in Seattle was James Flanigan. This diagnosis became somewhat of a wake up call for the rest of the gay community. In October 1983 men were writing the Seattle Gay News telling the community to wake up and start to protect themselves. Seattle's ACT UP chapter also started organizing protests and doing work to get funding for AIDS care and research. In 1983 and 1984 the Chicken Soup Brigade (today part of the Life Long AIDS Alliance) was created by Josh Joshua. Chicken Soup became the backbone of the gay community with groups of volunteers cooking and caring for those who were ill with HIV.

Seattle's most major HIV focused organization is likely Life Long AIDS Alliance . Life Long organizes services for people living with AIDS and is simultaneously active in the LGBT community by holding support groups and awareness events such as Gay Bingo. Shanti/Seattle was created to train volunteers to understand the emotional stages of HIV/AIDS.
Another key organization is the Dunshee House which was originally born from Seattle's first gay awareness group, the Dorian Society. Dunshee House  organizes all levels and types of support groups for HIV seropositive people. Also, Bailey Boushay house is an AIDS hospice care center run through Virginia Mason Hospital.

See also

 Equal Rights Washington
 LGBT rights in the United States
 Washington House Bill 2661

References

LGBT
LGBT culture in Seattle
Seattle